Iris was a schooner launched at Port Huron, Michigan, in 1866. She spent 47 years sailing the Great Lakes; for most of this time she was based out of Detroit Harbor, Wisconsin. In 1913 she sank in Lake Michigan off the coast of Washington Island in Door County, Wisconsin, United States. Her crew abandoned her after she ran aground.

In 2006, the shipwreck site was added to the U.S. National Register of Historic Places.

References

1866 ships
Door County, Wisconsin
Maritime incidents in 1913
Shipwrecks of Lake Michigan
Shipwrecks of the Wisconsin coast
Shipwrecks on the National Register of Historic Places in Wisconsin
National Register of Historic Places in Door County, Wisconsin
Ships built in Port Huron, Michigan